Rudolf "Rudi" Dobermann (14 December 1902 – 1 November 1979) was a German athlete. He competed in the long jump at the 1928 Summer Olympics and finished 18th. His club was the Marienburger SC of Cologne.

Dobermann first trained in gymnastics and then changed to athletics, winning the German long jump title in 1925–1927; he finished third in the shot put in 1930. He also won the British long jump title in 1927 and set a European record at 7.64 m in 1928. In 1930 he immigrated to São Paulo, Brazil, where he first worked as a coach with the German School (Escola Allemã), with which he won the state college athletics championships (campeonato collegial de athletismo) of 1931.  He was also one of the three coaches for the athletes of the state of São Paulo which participated in the Latin-American Championships (or Games) of the same year. From 1934 he was a coach and official with the Brazilian Athletics Confederation. Later he became a businessman.

References

1902 births
1979 deaths
People from Iserlohn
Sportspeople from Arnsberg (region)
German male long jumpers
Athletes (track and field) at the 1928 Summer Olympics
Olympic athletes of Germany
German emigrants to Brazil